Eucratea is a genus of bryozoans belonging to the monotypic family Eucrateidae.

The species of this genus are found in Northern Hemisphere.

Species:

Eucratea loricata 
Eucratea wallaysii

References

Bryozoan genera